Van Hoensbroeck (in German: Hoensbroech) is a royal and aristocratic family with medieval origins in the town of Hoensbroek near Heerlen in Limburg, Netherlands.

History
 is the first known ancestor of the family; he was killed in the Battle of Baesweiler in 1371. During many centuries, the family owned and lived on Hoensbroek Castle, which can still be visited today. They played an important social and political role in the region.

In the Netherlands a comital cadet branch survives. In Germany, the family continues to thrive as Marquess & Marchioness and counts von und zu Hoensbroech.

Gallery

Literature

References

External links
 Von Hoensbroech family.

German noble families
Hoensbroeck, van